Beyond the Missouri Sky (Short Stories) is a jazz album by the bassist Charlie Haden and the guitarist Pat Metheny. It won the Grammy Award for Best Jazz Instrumental Performance.

Composition 
"Tears of Rain" is an original composition for this project by Metheny, recorded with his sitar guitar. In the CD booklet, Haden asserts (incorrectly) that Johnny Mandel's "The Moon Song" had never been recorded before.

Reception 
The Penguin Guide to Jazz selected the album as part of its suggested Core Collection.
AllMusic called it "a fine record when the material is happening, but a bit of a chore when it is not".

Track listing

Personnel 
 Charlie Haden – double bass
 Pat Metheny – acoustic guitars and all other instruments

Awards
1997 – 40th Annual GRAMMY Awards

References 

1997 albums
Charlie Haden albums
Pat Metheny albums
Collaborative albums
Verve Records albums
Albums recorded at MSR Studios
Grammy Award for Best Jazz Instrumental Album